Masaoka is a Japanese surname. Notable people with the surname include:

Kenzō Masaoka (1898–1988), early anime creator
Kunio Masaoka (1908–1978), renowned Japanese photographer
Masaoka Shiki (1867–1902), pen-name of Masaoka Noboru, a Japanese author, poet, literary critic, and journalist
Mike Masaoka (1915–1991), American activist and member of The Church of Jesus Christ of Latter-day Saints
Miya Masaoka (born 1958), American musician and composer who performs on the 17-string Japanese koto zither
Onan Masaoka (born 1977), Major League Baseball left-handed pitcher

Japanese-language surnames